The Euphrosinidae are a family of polychaete worms. The name is from Greek Euphrosyne, meaning merriment; she was one of the three Graces.

Clade

Species
Euphrosinidae contains the following genera and species:

Euphrosine Lamarck, 1818
 Euphrosine abyssalis Kudenov, 1993
 Euphrosine affinis Horst, 1903
 Euphrosine arctia Johnson, 1897
 Euphrosine armadillo Sars, 1851
 Euphrosine armadilloides Ehlers, 1900
 Euphrosine armata Kudenov, 1993
 Euphrosine aurantiaca Johnson, 1897
 Euphrosine bicirrata Moore, 1905
 Euphrosine borealis Örstedt, 1843
 Euphrosine calypta Essenberg, 1917
 Euphrosine capensis Kinberg, 1857
 Euphrosine ceylonica Michaelsen, 1892
 Euphrosine cirrata Sars, 1862
 Euphrosine cirrataepropinqua Amoureux, 1982
 Euphrosine cirribranchis Hartmann-Schröder & Rosenfeldt, 1992
 Euphrosine digitalis Imajima, 2009
 Euphrosine dumosa Moore, 1911
 Euphrosine echidna Kudenov, 1993
 Euphrosine foliosa Audouin & H Milne Edwards, 1833
 Euphrosine globosa Horst, 1912
 Euphrosine heterobranchia Johnson, 1901
 Euphrosine hortensis Moore, 1905
 Euphrosine hystrix Horst, 1903
 Euphrosine keldyshi Detinova, 1986
 Euphrosine laureata Savigny in Lamarck, 1818
 Euphrosine limbata Moore, 1911
 Euphrosine longesetosa Horst, 1903
 Euphrosine maculata Horst, 1903
 Euphrosine magellanica Ehlers, 1900
 Euphrosine maorica Augener, 1924
 Euphrosine mastersi Haswell, 1878
 Euphrosine monroi Kudenov, 1993
 Euphrosine mucosa Horst, 1903
 Euphrosine multibranchiata Essenberg, 1917
 Euphrosine myrtosa Savigny in Lamarck, 1818
 Euphrosine notialis Ehlers, 1900
 Euphrosine obiensis Horst, 1903
 Euphrosine orientalis Gustafson, 1930
 Euphrosine panamica Chamberlin, 1919
 Euphrosine pelagica Horst, 1903
 Euphrosine pilosa Horst, 1903
 Euphrosine polyclada Imajima, 2003
 Euphrosine pseudonotialis Imajima, 2009
 Euphrosine ramosa Imajima, 2003
 Euphrosine samoana Augener, 1927
 Euphrosine setosissima Ehlers, 1900
 Euphrosine sibogae Horst, 1903
 Euphrosine superba Marenzeller, 1879
 Euphrosine tosaensis Imajima, 2001
 Euphrosine triloba Ehlers, 1887
 Euphrosine tripartita Hoagland, 1920
 Euphrosine uruguayensis Rullier & Amoureux, 1979
Euphrosinella Detinova, 1985
Euphrosinella cirratoformis (Averincev, 1972)
Euphrosinella paucibranchiata (Hartman, 1960)
Euphrosinopsis Kudenov, 1993
Euphrosinopsis antarctica (Hartmann-Schröder & Rosenfeldt, 1992)
Euphrosinopsis crassiseta Kudenov, 1993
Euphrosinopsis horsti Kudenov, 1993
Palmyreuphrosyne Fauvel, 1913
Palmyreuphrosyne pacifica Augener, 1924
Palmyreuphrosyne paradoxa Fauvel, 1913

Notes

References

Errantia
Annelid families